Vialone Nano is an Italian semifino (medium-grain) rice variety. It is typical of the flat, rice-growing areas of the southern Provincia di Verona (Bassa Veronese, "Veronese lowlands"), in Veneto.
Vialone Nano is a cultivar of the Japonica group of varieties of Oryza sativa.

Culinary uses
Similar to the Carnaroli, Vialone Nano is an appreciated risotto rice. While rich in starch (therefore making for creamy risottos), its high amylose content allows it to maintain its shape and absorb much liquid during cooking.

Riso Nano Vialone Veronese IGP
Vialone Nano rice has been grown in Italy since 1937. It was developed by crossing Vialone rice with a variety called Nano because of the plant's low height.

In 1996 Veronese Vialone Nano rice was given the Protected geographical indication, under the name of Riso Nano Vialone Veronese IGP.

The processed grain should be of medium size, round in shape and semi-long with pronounced tooth and rounded section. It should appear white in color and display an extended pearlescent core.

Area of production
Cultivation and processing of Nano Vialone Veronese IGP is conducted exclusively in the territory of the following 24 municipalities, all within the Provincia di Verona:

Bovolone
Buttapietra
Casaleone
Cerea
Concamarise
Erbè
Gazzo Veronese
Isola della Scala
Isola Rizza
Mozzecane
Nogara
Nogarole Rocca
Oppeano
Palù
Povegliano Veronese
Ronco all'Adige
Roverchiara
Salizzole
Sanguinetto
San Pietro di Morubio
Sorgà
Trevenzuolo
Vigasio
Zevio

See also
Arborio
Carnaroli
Maratelli
Oryza sativa
Italian cuisine

References

Cuisine of Veneto
Italian cuisine
Italian products with protected designation of origin
Japonica rice
Rice varieties